Be with dot below (Б̣, б̣; italics: Б̣, б̣) is a letter of the Cyrillic script.

It was found in the Khakas alphabet project of M. I. Raikov in the 1920s.

See also 

 Be (Cyrillic)
 Cyrillic script in Unicode

Cyrillic letters with diacritics
Letters with dot